Fontaine-le-Mallet is a commune in the Seine-Maritime department in the Normandy region in northern France.

History
The first mention of the village dates from the eleventh century, when an abbess from Montivilliers bought  of land in order to build a church here "in villa dicitur Fontenais ad opus ecclesiae Sancta Mariae".
In a register of the Secretariat of the Archdiocese of Rouen, dating from 1479 to 1480, it mentions "Parochia Fontibus le Mallet" - Mallet coming from the name of the first seigneurs - the Malet de Graville family (c. 1200–1300).
Fontaine-la-Mallet grew over the centuries and was all but destroyed by bombing in September 1944. It was the most badly affected village of the lower Seine. Rebuilding of the commune was started in the 1960s.

Heraldry

Geography

Population

See also
Communes of the Seine-Maritime department

References

External links

 Official commune website

Communes of Seine-Maritime